The Communauté de communes Bray-Eawy is a communauté de communes in the Seine-Maritime département and in the Normandy région of France. It was formed on 1 January 2017 by the merger of the former Communauté de communes du Pays Neufchâtelois, Communauté de communes de Saint-Saëns-Portes de Bray and 8 communes from the former Communauté de communes du Bosc d'Eawy  on 1 January 2017. It consists of 46 communes, and its seat is in Neufchâtel-en-Bray. Its area is 488.4 km2, and its population was 25,106 in 2019.

Composition
The communauté de communes consists of the following 46 communes:

Ardouval
Auvilliers
Bellencombre
Bosc-Bérenger
Bosc-Mesnil
Bouelles
Bradiancourt
Bully
Callengeville
Critot
Esclavelles
Fesques
Flamets-Frétils
Fontaine-en-Bray
Fresles
Graval
La Crique
Les Grandes-Ventes
Lucy
Massy
Mathonville
Maucomble
Ménonval
Mesnières-en-Bray
Mesnil-Follemprise
Montérolier
Mortemer
Nesle-Hodeng
Neufbosc
Neufchâtel-en-Bray
Neuville-Ferrières
Pommeréval
Quièvrecourt
Rocquemont
Rosay
Sainte-Beuve-en-Rivière
Sainte-Geneviève
Saint-Germain-sur-Eaulne
Saint-Hellier
Saint-Martin-l'Hortier
Saint-Martin-Osmonville
Saint-Saëns
Saint-Saire
Sommery
Vatierville
Ventes-Saint-Rémy

References 

Bray-Eawy
Bray-Eawy